Self-sacrifice is the giving up of something that a person wants for themselves so that others can be helped or protected or so that other external value can be advanced or protected.

See also
 Altruism (unselfishness)
 Altruistic suicide
 Sacrifice
 Self-denial
 Self-sacrifice in Jewish law

External links
 Self-denial and self-sacrifice in the life and teaching of Jesus, 1966
 Self-Interest and the Concept of Self-Sacrifice, 1980
 Self-sacrifice, Cooperation and Aggression in Women of Varying Sex-role Orientations by Pauline M. Baefsky, Stephen E. Berger, 1974
 self-sacrifice search in Google Scholar
 self-sacrifice, onelook.com

References

Sacrifice